The Glasgow and South Western Railway (G&SWR) 131 Class and 137 Class were two closely related classes of 4-4-0 steam locomotive designed by Peter Drummond, of which a total of 12 were built in 1913-15 by the North British Locomotive Company (NBL) at its Queens Park works and by the G&SWR at its own Kilmarnock works. Originally built as the 131 and 137 classes, as a result of renumbering they became known as the 331 and 325 classes in 1919, before passing to the London Midland and Scottish Railway (LMS) on its formation in 1923, where they were given power classification 3P.

131 Class
The appointment of Peter Drummond as locomotive superintendent of the G&SWR at the end of 1911 resulted in significant changes in the design of subsequent locomotives, as Drummond was an 'outsider' to the G&SWR with little affinity for the established Kilmarnock design principles and a preference for much larger locomotives than the railway was then operating.  In many ways Peter Drummond's designs mirrored those of his elder brother Dugald on the London and South Western Railway, including a preference for big engines and the eschewing of superheating in favour of smokebox steam driers.  The first products of this approach on the G&SWR were the 279 Class 0-6-0 goods engines of 1913, and next off the NBL production line were six 4-4-0 passenger locomotives of the 131 Class.

The 131 Class shared many of the attributes of the 279s.  Just as the 279 class were Britain's heaviest 0-6-0s at the time of their construction, the 131s were Britain's heaviest 4-4-0s at the time.  They were delivered to Greenock (Princes Pier) and Ayr locomotive sheds for use on passenger services from the Clyde coast towns into Glasgow, but their performance was initially disappointing for such large engines and there were various reliability problems.  They were generally lacking in speed and this was especially pronounced when climbing gradients, so by the end of 1916 all six locomotives were allocated to Ayr for use on the relatively level Ayr-Glasgow line.  As they were used on relatively lightweight passenger trains the coal consumption was acceptable and the defective big end design did not give quite the same trouble as on the 279 class, but overheating of the bogie axleboxes was a constant problem.  It was suspected that the bogies were carrying an incorrect amount of weight, but identification of the problem was hindered by the fact that the locomotives were too heavy for the weighing machine at Kilmarnock works.

137 Class
The shortcomings of the 131 Class led to two important changes for the next batch of passenger locomotives.  Although very similar to the 131s in most respects, the new 137s featured superheating and improved feed-water heating arrangements.  These alterations would have added to the weight of the locomotives, but no official weight was ever published for the 137 class in their original condition.  It has been suggested that one locomotive was sent to the NBL to be weighed, but that the G&SWR suppressed the figure. Estimates based on the official weight of engine and tender combined and on later LMS official weights after modifications suggest that the locomotives would have weighed approximately 64 tons 1 cwt as built.  Amongst British 4-4-0s only the later LNER D49 and SR Schools classes were heavier.

The modifications were successful, and the 137s were a great improvement over the 131 class, being fast and very economical in coal and water.  Unfortunately the deficiencies of the axleboxes and the big ends had not been rectified, and this prevented the locomotives from being regularly employed on G&SWR's heaviest and important express trains on the Glasgow to Carlisle line. Instead they spent most of their lives on second tier services, although their speed and hill-climbing abilities were useful on the steeply graded lines to Stranraer.

LMS service
The superiority of the subsequent 137 class led the LMS to rebuild five of the 131 class with superheating between 1923 and 1931, leaving only no. 14511 with a saturated boiler, which it retained until withdrawal.  Although all of the superheated engines were capable of good, economical performance the reliability problems were never fully overcome, and as a small group of only twelve locomotives they were deemed to be non-standard by the LMS.  They were therefore withdrawn and scrapped between 1934 and 1937, having outlasted all of the other G&SWR tender engines except the 403 Class moguls.

Locomotive numbering and histories

References

 
 
 

4-4-0 locomotives
131
NBL locomotives
Railway locomotives introduced in 1913
Scrapped locomotives
Standard gauge steam locomotives of Great Britain